The 2023 Gqeberha mass shooting or the Gqeberha birthday party shooting was a mass shooting which occurred between 17:15 and 17:30SAST on 29 January 2023. It took place at a private home in the KwaZakhele township of Gqeberha, in which the two gunmen opened fire on the guests who were attending a birthday party before fleeing the scene, resulting in the death of eight people. Initially, seven people were declared dead at the scene with an additional four people injured. One of the four injured people later died of their injuries in a hospital. The South African Police Service stated that the motive for the attack was unknown.

Victims

The two unidentified gunmen initially killed 7 people and wounded 4 people at the party, with the people killed including two men: Andile Sishuba and Vusumzi Sishuba, who was celebrating his 51st birthday. Later, one injured person later died in a hospital, increasing the death toll to 8 people. Of the 8 fatalities, there were 5 men and 3 women identified, aged 20 to 64.

References 

2023 murders in South Africa
2023 mass shootings in Africa
21st-century mass murder in Africa
January 2023 crimes in Africa
January 2023 events in South Africa
Mass murder in 2023

Mass shootings in South Africa
Murder in South Africa
History of Eastern Cape